Benjamin Hudson is an American historian.

Benjamin Hudson may also refer to:

Ben Hudson, Australian rules footballer
Mr Hudson, Benjamin Hudson McIldowie, English musician
Sir Benjamin Hudson, 3rd Baronet (c. 1665–1730) of the Hudson Baronets
Benjamin Doug Hudson, American football player